Einar Nilsson (8 June 1891 – 22 February 1937) was a Swedish track and field athlete who competed in the 1912 and 1920 Summer Olympics. In 1912 he entered the pentathlon, decathlon and two varieties of shot put and discus throw. He failed to complete his decathlon program, but placed fourth-tenth in the throwing events. In 1920 he qualified only in the shot put and finished fifth.

Nilsson held national records in the shot put and discus throw, becoming the first Swede to break the 40 m barrier. He won five national titles in the shot put (1911–1914) and two in the discus (1911 and 1912), and placed second six times.

References

1891 births
1937 deaths
Swedish male discus throwers
Swedish male shot putters
Swedish decathletes
Olympic athletes of Sweden
Athletes (track and field) at the 1912 Summer Olympics
Athletes (track and field) at the 1920 Summer Olympics
Olympic decathletes